This is a list of songs written or co-written by American songwriter Desmond Child.

Aerosmith
"Heart's Done Time"
"Dude (Looks Like a Lady)"
"Angel"
"What It Takes"
"Flesh"
"Crazy"
"Hole in My Soul"
"Ain't That a Bitch"

Csézy 
"Csak egy nô" (Just a woman)

David Archuleta
"Desperate"

Clay Aiken
"Run to Me"
"These Open Arms"

Animotion
"Calling It Love"

Sebastian Bach
"Falling Into You"

Jimmy Barnes
"Waitin' for the Heartache"
"Walk On"
"Let's Make It Last All Night"

Robin Beck
"If You Were a Woman and I Was a Man"
"Hide Your Heart"
"Hold Back The Night"
"Jewel In My Crown"
"Save Up All Your Tears"
"Tears in the Rain"

Petra Berger
"Requiem"

Bif Naked
"I Love Myself Today"

Blackhawk
"It Ain't About Love Anymore"
"Hole In My Heart"

Michael Bolton
"How Can We Be Lovers?"
"Love Cuts Deep"
"Forever Isn't Long Enough"
"New Love"
"Save Me"
"The One Thing"
"In the Arms of Love"

Bon Jovi
"You Give Love a Bad Name"
"Livin' on a Prayer"
"Without Love"
"I'd Die For You"
"Bad Medicine"
"Born to Be My Baby"
"Blood on Blood"
"Wild is the Wind"
"Keep the Faith"
"I'll Sleep When I'm Dead"
"Something for the Pain"
"This Ain't a Love Song" / "Como Yo Nadie Te Ha Amado" (Spanish version)
"Hearts Breaking Even"
"Diamond Ring"
"The Distance"
"Misunderstood"
"All About Lovin' You"
"Hook Me Up"
"Bells of Freedom"
"Dirty Little Secret"
"(You Want to) Make a Memory"
"Let's Make it Baby" (demo, special release)
"Brokenpromiseland"
"Fast Cars"
"Happy Now"
"Learn to Love"
"Army of One"

Bonfire
"The Price of Loving You"
"Sword and Stone"

Boyzone
"All the Time in the World"

Cher
"Emotional Fire"
"Does Anybody Really Fall In Love Anymore?"
"Just Like Jesse James"
"Save Up All Your Tears"
"We All Sleep Alone"
"Perfection"
"Working Girl"
"Give Our Love a Fighting Chance"
"Love On A Rooftop"
"Main Man"

Chicago
"All Roads Lead to You"

Kelly Clarkson
"Before Your Love"

Alice Cooper
"Poison"
"Spark in the Dark"
"House of Fire"
"Why Trust You"
"Bed of Nails"
"This Maniac's In Love With You"
"Trash"
"Hell is Living Without You"
"I'm Your Gun"
"Dangerous Tonight"
"Might As Well Be On Mars"
"I Am Made of You"
"The Underture"

Miranda Cosgrove
"Beautiful Mess"

D-Side
"Invisible"
"Can We Dance"
"I'd Be Lyin'"
"My Best Chance"

Hazell Dean
"Livin' on a Prayer"

Diana DeGarmo
"Dreams"
"Emotional"
"Reaching For Heaven"

Dream Theater
"You Not Me"

Haylie Duff
"Whatever Life"

Hilary Duff
"Who's That Girl?"
"Crash World"

FM
"Bad Luck"
"Burning My Heart Down"

Ace Frehley
"Hide Your Heart"

Selena Gomez
"Love Will Remember"

Alejandra Guzmán
"Quiero Vivir" ("I Want to Live", Spanish translation of "Old Before I Die")
"Volveré a Amar"
"Todo"
"Vagabundo Corazón"
"Soy Tu Lluvia"

Hall & Oates
"And That's What Hurts"

Hanson
"Weird"

Chesney Hawkes
"Waiting for the Night"

Ty Herndon with Stephanie Bentley
"Heart Half Empty"

Sarah Hudson
"Girl on the Verge"
"Fake Rain"

INXS
"Afterglow"

Joan Jett & the Blackhearts
"I Hate Myself for Loving You"
"Little Liar"
"You Want In and I Want Out"
"Ashes In The Wind"
"The Only Good Thing (You Ever Said Was Goodbye)"
"Lie to Me"
"Don't Surrender"
"Goodbye"
"As I Am"
"You Got A Problem"
"Brighter Day"

Jonas Brothers
"You Just Don't Know It"

Kiss
"I Was Made For Lovin' You"
"I've Had Enough (Into the Fire)"
"Heaven's on Fire"
"Under the Gun"
"King of the Mountain"
"Who Wants to Be Lonely"
"I'm Alive"
"Radar for Love"
"Uh! All Night"
"Bang Bang You"
"My Way"
"Reason to Live"
"You Love Me to Hate You"
"Let's Put The X In Sex"
"(You Make Me) Rock Hard"
"Hide Your Heart"

La Ley
"Más Allá"

Lindsay Lohan
"I Live For The Day"

Ricky Martin
"Livin' la Vida Loca"
"Spanish Eyes"  ("La Diosa del Carnaval")
"I Am Made of You"
"I'm On My Way"
"The Cup of Life"  ("La Copa De La Vida")
"Love You for a Day"
"She Bangs"
"Saint Tropez"
"Nobody Wants to Be Lonely"
"Jezabel"
"The Touch"
"Are You In It For Love"
"Shake Your Bon-Bon"

Jesse McCartney
"Because You Live"

Stephanie McIntosh
"The Night Of My Life"

Cyndi Lauper
"Insecurious"

Mitch Malloy
"Music Box"
"Cowboy and the Ballerina"

Meat Loaf
"The Monster Is Loose"
"Blind as a Bat"
"If God Could Talk"
"What About Love?"
"Alive"
"Monstro"
"Elvis in Vegas" 
"I Wanna Be With You" (unreleased)

Michelle
"Emotional"

Mika
"Erase"

Billie Myers
"A Few Words Too Many"
"Kiss the Rain"

Alannah Myles
"Bad 4 You"

Vince Neil
"Promise Me"

O Town
"Love Should Be A Crime"

Katy Perry
"Waking Up in Vegas"

Play
"Let's Get to the Love Part"

Marion Raven
"Good 4 Sex"
"October"

Chynna Phillips
"Jewel in my Crown"
"This Close"
"I Live for You"

Ratt
"Givin' Yourself Away"
"Lovin' You's a Dirty Job"
"One Step Away"
"Shame Shame Shame"
"Can't Wait on Love"
"Scratch That Itch"
"Hard Time"
"Heads I Win, Tails You Lose"
"All or Nothing"
"Top Secret"

LeAnn Rimes
"Life Goes On"
"Suddenly"
"The Safest Place"
"Sign of Life"
"Review My Kisses"
"Love Is an Army"
"You Made Me Find Myself"
"Twisted Angel"

Kane Roberts
"Wild Nights"
"Twisted"
"Does Anybody Really Fall In Love Anymore?"
"Dance Little Sister"
"Rebel Heart"
"You Always Want It"
"Fighter"
"I'm Not Lookin' For An Angel"
"Too Far Gone"
"It's Only Over For You"

Sakis Rouvas
"Ola Kala"
"Oso Zo"
"Mia Zoi Mazi"
"Kati Omorfo"
"Disco Girl"

Roxette
"You Don't Understand Me"

Lesley Roy
"Misfit"

Ru Paul
"If You Were a Woman (And I Was a Man)"

Jennifer Rush
"Heart Wars"
"Love of a Stranger"
"Down to You"
"Everything"
"Waiting for the Heartache"
"Timeless Love"
"Tears in the Rain"
"In the Arms of Love"

Richie Sambora
"Father Time"
"Rosie"

Saraya
"Timeless Love"

Scorpions
"Hour 1"
"The Game of Life"
"The Future Never Dies"
"You're Lovin' Me to Death"
"321"
"Love Will Keep Us Alive"
"We Will Rise Again"
"Your Last Song"
"Love is War"
"The Cross"
"Humanity"
"Cold"

Shakira
"Tu Seras Historia De Mi Vida"

Victoria Shaw
"Where Your Road Leads"

Billy Squier
"Stronger"
"Tied Up"

Paul Stanley
"Live To Win"
"Lift"
"Wake Up Screaming"
"All About You"
"Where Angels Dare"

Paul Stanley and Desmond Child
" Shocker" Shocker OST

Joss Stone
"Right To Be Wrong"
"Don't Cha Wanna Ride"

Amanda Stott
"Homeless Heart"

Barbra Streisand
"Lady Liberty"Swirl 360"Love Should Be a Crime"
"There"Three Graces"Requiem"Tokio Hotel"Zoom/Zoom Into Me"
"Strange (feat. Kerli)"Laura Turner"The Touch"Bonnie Tyler"If You Were a Woman (And I Was a Man)"
"Lovers Again"
"Notes From America"
"Hide Your Heart"
"Save Up All Your Tears"
"Take Another Look at Your Heart"
"Believe in Me (Bonnie Tyler song)"
"Stubborn"
"Stronger Than a Man''Carrie Underwood"Inside Your Heaven"Steve Vai"In My Dreams With You"Maria Vidal"Do Me Right"John Waite"These Times Are Hard for Lovers"Weezer"Trainwrecks"The Rasmus"Jezebel"Robbie Williams"Old Before I Die"Winger"Proud Desperado"Trisha Yearwood with Garth Brooks"Where Your Road Leads"Ace Young"Addicted"
"A Hard Hand to Hold"
"Where Will You Go"
"How You Gonna Spend Your Life"
"The Girl That Got Away"
"Dirty Mind"
"The Gift"Zedd"Beautiful Now"2Be3'''
 "Excuse My French"
 "Whatchagonnado"
 "Love 4 Sale"
 "Come Into My Life"

 
Child, Desmond